Paul B. Spiegel (born 1965 ) is a Canadian physician, epidemiologist, and academic who specializes in humanitarian health.

He is the director for the center for humanitarian health at Johns Hopkins University.

Early life and education 
Spiegel was born in Toronto, Canada.

He has a bachelor's degree from Western University in 1987, a degree in medicine from the University of Toronto in 1991, and a masters in public health from the Johns Hopkins Bloomberg School of Public Health in 1996.

Career 
Spiegel's career took him to refugee camps in Kenya in 1992 and the Democratic Republic of the Congo (formerly Zaire at the time) in 1995 where he worked as a medical coordinator for both Médecins Sans Frontières and Médecins du Monde, respectively. He has worked at the Centers for Disease Control in the international emergency and refugee health branch as an epidemiologist, where he won the Charles C. Shepard award outstanding contribution to public health. In 2002, he joined United Nations High Commissioner for Refugees where he started the HIV unit. He then became the Chief of the Public Health and HIV section in 2006. In 2011, he became the Deputy Director of the Department of Programme Support and Management where he oversaw four sections: public health; cash programming, shelter and settlements; and operations, solutions and transitions. He has also worked as a consultant to the Pan American Health Organization and the Canadian Red Cross.

He is currently the Director of the Center for Humanitarian Health and a professor of practice at Johns Hopkins University and the co-chair of  the UCL–Lancet Commission on Migration and Health.

Selected publications 
He has published over one hundred academic articles on humanitarian health and migration, including:
 Spiegel PB, The humanitarian system is not just broke, but broken: recommendations for future humanitarian action, The Lancet. 2017 DOI: 10.1016/S0140-6763(17)31278-3.
 Abubakar I, Aldridge RW, Devakumar D, Orcutt M, Burns R, Barreto ML, Dhanvan P, Fouad F, Groce N, Guo Y, Hargreaves S, Knipper M, Miranda J, Madise N, Kumar B, Mosca D, McGovern T, Rubenstein L, Sammonds P, Sawyer S, Sheikh K, Tollman S, Spiegel P, Zimmerman K. The UCL-Lancet Commission on Migration and Health: the health of a world on the move. The Lancet. 2018;392(10164):2606-54.
 Spiegel PB, Bennedsen AR, Claass J, Bruns L, Patterson N, Yiweza D, et al, Prevalence of HIV infection in conflict-affected and displaced people in seven sub-Saharan African countries: a systematic review, The Lancet. 2007;369(9580):2187-95
 Spiegel P, Khalifa Aadam, Mateen Farrah J, Cancer in refugees in Jordan and Syria between 2009 and 2012: challenges and the way forward in humanitarian emergencies, Lancet Oncology. 2014;15(7):e290-7.
 Spiegel PB, Salama Peter, War and mortality in Kosovo, 1998-99: an epidemiological testimony, The Lancet, 2000;355(9222):2204-9.
 Venezuela’s Humanitarian Emergency: Large-Scale UN Response Needed to Address Health and Food Crises, published by Human Rights Watch in 2019.

Personal life 
Spiegel is married and has one daughter. He lives in Baltimore, Maryland.

References 

Living people
Canadian emigrants to the United States
Canadian physicians
Canadian humanitarians
Johns Hopkins Bloomberg School of Public Health alumni
Johns Hopkins University faculty
Canadian academics
1965 births